Elisabeth Ann Zinser (born February 20, 1940) is a retired university president, most recently at Southern Oregon University (2001–06) in Ashland, Oregon. Previously she was the chancellor of the Lexington campus of the University of Kentucky (1995–2001), and the first female president of the University of Idaho, serving from 1989–95 in Moscow, Idaho.

She holds a bachelor's degree from Stanford, a master's from UCSF, and a doctorate from the University of California, Berkeley. She also received an MBA from the MIT Sloan School of Management.

Prior to assuming the presidency at the University of Idaho, Zinser received national attention in 1988 when she was named the seventh president of Gallaudet University in Washington, DC. She served for less than a week, March 6–10, and then resigned due to protests over her selection in what came to be known as the "Deaf President Now" protest at Gallaudet, saying that the protest was "a monumental event in the history of deaf culture." The protesters thanked her for making a graceful exit, noting that she had become an "innocent victim and an unfortunate target" of their collective anger.

Personal
A native of Meadville, Pennsylvania, Zinser is a former board member of the Oregon Shakespeare Festival in Ashland.

While at Idaho in 1991, she married W. Don Mackin of Moscow; the wedding was the first in the university's new arboretum. Mackin  was a graduate of Washington State University in nearby Pullman and a former state senator from Moscow, Idaho. They were married for two decades, until he unexpectedly died in his sleep at age 73 in Ashland.

References

Presidents of the University of Idaho
Stanford University alumni
University of California, San Francisco alumni
UC Berkeley College of Letters and Science alumni
MIT Sloan School of Management alumni
Presidents of Gallaudet University
Living people
Southern Oregon University people
1940 births
People from Meadville, Pennsylvania